The Haldane Lecture is an award lecture given at the John Innes Centre in the United Kingdom since 2001. The lecture is named in honour of J.B.S. Haldane, who was employed by the John Innes Trustees from 1927 to 1937 under the directorship of Alfred Daniel Hall.

Haldane Lecturers 
Source: John Innes Centre
 2017  Eske Willerslev 
 2016 Michael Elowitz
 2014 Michael Lynch
 2011 Simon Levin
 2007 Herbert Jäckle
 2006 Bruce Stillman
 2004 Pat Brown
 2003 Sydney Brenner
 2002 Tim Mitchison
 2001 John Maynard Smith

All Haldane Lecturers are presented with a print of a work of art by Leonie Woolhouse, wife of Harold Woolhouse. During their visit to the John Innes Centre, Haldane Lecturers are given the opportunity to have their portrait painted by Enrico Coen as a memento.

See also

 List of genetics awards

References 

Genetics awards
Genetics in the United Kingdom
Science and technology in Norfolk
Science lecture series
Medical lecture series